The Pasco County Sheriff's Office (PSO) is the law enforcement agency responsible for Pasco County, Florida. It is the largest law enforcement agency within the county, and serves as a full service law enforcement and detention agency for the over 512,000 citizens of Pasco County, Florida.

History 
The current Sheriff is Chris Nocco, who was appointed by Governor Rick Scott. Former Sheriff Bob White announced his early retirement effective May 1, 2011.  On April 25, 2011, Florida governor Rick Scott appointed Major Chris Nocco to fulfill the remaining two years left on Sheriff White's term. Nocco ran unopposed in the 2020 election cycle, securing another four-year term.

In February 2015, the Pasco Sheriff's Office (PSO) was the first Sheriff's Office in the central Florida region to adopt a full scale body camera program. The PSO issued a body worn camera manufactured by TASER Inc to every one of its Deputy Sheriffs on patrol in the county.

In 2021, the Pasco County Sheriff's Office was sued by a family that alleged harassment against them after an "intelligence-led" program run by the PSO identified the son in the family as a likely future criminal, and the police proceeded to interact frequently with the family. The PSO program has been subject to widespread criticism from civil rights experts and legal experts. According to American University law professor Andrew Ferguson, "They basically built this system as a justification to chase the bad kids out of town, to monitor them in over-aggressive ways with no intention to help them but to make their lives so miserable that they would leave."

References

External links
Pasco County Sheriff's Office official webpage

Pasco County, Florida
Sheriffs' departments of Florida
1887 establishments in Florida